Mikhael Roy Ricks (born November 14, 1974) is a former National Football League (NFL) tight end.

Ricks attended Anahuac High School in Anahuac, Texas. He went to college at Stephen F. Austin State University, where he played football and basketball. He was drafted in the second round of the 1998 NFL Draft by the San Diego Chargers. He played in 16 games in his first season with the Chargers. He has also played for the Kansas City Chiefs, Detroit Lions, and Dallas Cowboys.

References

1974 births
American football tight ends
Detroit Lions players
Kansas City Chiefs players
Living people
People from Galveston, Texas
San Diego Chargers players
Stephen F. Austin Lumberjacks football players